The Western Great Lakes forests is a terrestrial ecoregion as defined by the World Wildlife Fund. It is within the temperate broadleaf and mixed forests biome of North America. It is found in northern areas of the United States' states of Michigan, Wisconsin and Minnesota, and in southern areas of the Canadian province of Manitoba and northwestern areas of the province of Ontario.

Setting
The Western Great Lakes forests, in large part, lie in the northwestern Great Lakes Basin near the shores of Lake Huron, Lake Michigan  and Lake Superior, including the entire Upper peninsula of Michigan and large parts of Northern Wisconsin, around Lake Superior into much of northern Minnesota and a smaller section into Canada. In the west, the ecoregion surrounds the lakes and rivers that divide Minnesota from Ontario, including Lake of the Woods and Rainy River, and it extends near the Winnipeg River into southeastern Manitoba.

This region has warm summers and cold, snowy winters.  This region is generally similar in climate and condition to the Eastern forest-boreal transition to its east, except that it is generally somewhat drier (the prevailing winds blow west to east and drier air from the plains comes here first before it picks up moisture over the lakes) and, especially in its southern and central areas, its soil is much thicker and less acidic, which makes for more varied vegetation.

Flora

This ecoregion is a transition area between the taiga (Boreal forest) to the north and the temperate deciduous forest and tallgrass prairie to the south and west and thus contains a variety of habitats including northern coniferous forests, northern hardwood forest, boreal hardwood-conifer forest, swamp forest, and peatland, in addition to freshwater marshes, bogs, fens, and hardwood river basins and conifer swamps, and large hardwood and conifer stands. Trees of the woodland include white pine (Pinus strobus) and red pine (Pinus resinosa) with paper birch (Betula papyrifera) and aspen, and jack pine (Pinus banksiana) forests, red pine, oak (Quercus spp.), and hazel (Corylus cornuta). "Common species of the northern hardwoods include sugar maple (Acer saccharum), red maple (Acer rubrum), American beech (Fagus grandifolia), hop hornbeam (Ostrya virginiana), basswood (Tilia americana), yellow birch (Betula alleghaniensis) and eastern hemlock (Tsuga canadensis)" and  Northern pin oak (Quercus ellipsoidalis).

Fauna
The Western Great Lakes forests are very rich in wildlife. Wildlife "include moose (Alces alces), black bear (Ursus americanus), lynx (Lynx canadensis), snowshoe hare (Lepus americanus), white-tailed deer (Odocoileus virginianus), and woodchuck (Marmota monax). Bird species include ruffed grouse (Bonasa umbellus), hooded merganser (Lophodytes cucullatus), pileated woodpecker (Dryocopus pileatus), bald eagle (Haleaeetus leucocephalus), turkey vulture (Cathartes aura), herring gull (Larus argentatus), and waterfowl. American black duck (Anas rubripes) and wood duck (Aix sponsa) occur in the eastern part of the ecoregion." After being nearly extirpated from the conterminous United States, gray wolves (Canis lupus) survived in the remote northeastern corner of Minnesota and Ontario. The repopulation of wolves in this region has occurred naturally as they have expanded their territory.

Threats and use
While the area does now have large protected sections, historically logging (especially of pine wood) has changed many sections and continues today.  Agricultural development, especially orchards in Lower Michigan has also reduced the habitat.  In addition, the establishment of roads and lakeside homes significantly impacts the forests.

Protected areas
Large protected areas of the Western Great Lakes forests include:
Boundary Waters Canoe Area Wilderness, northern Minnesota
Quetico Provincial Park, northwestern Ontario - 4,758.19 km2
Voyageurs National Park, northern Minnesota
Isle Royale National Park, northern Michigan
Apostle Islands National Lakeshore, northern Wisconsin
Porcupine Mountains State Park - northern Michigan
Turtle River Waterway Provincial Park - northwestern Ontario- 400.52 km2
La Verendrye Provincial Waterway Park - northwestern Ontario - 183.35 km2
Whiteshell Provincial Park - Manitoba (Backcountry zones) - 913 km2
Nopiming Provincial Park - Manitoba (Backcountry zones) - 316 km2
Lake of the Woods Provincial Park, northwestern Ontario - 129 km2
Lola Lake Provincial Nature Reserve, northwestern Ontario - 65.72 km2
Sandbar Lake Provincial Park, northwestern Ontario - 50.83 km2
Winnange Lake Provincial Park, northwestern Ontario - 47.45 km2
Portions of the United States National Forests (Wilderness Areas, RNAs, etc.) also provide protection (see e.g. Superior National Forest, Chequamegon-Nicolet National Forest)

See also
 List of ecoregions in Canada (WWF)
 List of ecoregions in the United States (WWF)

References

External links

 Species finder WWF
 
 
  Western Great Lakes forests.vanderbilt.edu

Temperate broadleaf and mixed forests in Canada
Temperate broadleaf and mixed forests in the United States
Ecoregions of the United States
Ecoregions of Canada
 
Nearctic ecoregions